Malaysia competed in the 2007 Southeast Asian Games held in Nakhon Ratchasima, Thailand from 6 to 15 December 2007.

Medal summary

Medals by sport

Medallists

Aquatics

Diving

Men

Women

Swimming

Men

Women

Baseball

Men's tournament

Basketball

Men's tournament

Times given below are in Time in Thailand (UTC+7).

Women's tournament

Times given below are in Time in Thailand (UTC+7).

Football

Men's tournament
Group B

Women's tournament
Group B

References

2007
Nations at the 2007 Southeast Asian Games